Namatjira is an electoral division of the Legislative Assembly in Australia's Northern Territory. It was created in 2012 when the former division of MacDonnell was renamed after the Aboriginal artist Albert Namatjira. Namatjira is an almost entirely rural electorate, covering 198,384 km², and taking in the resort town of Yulara, the remote communities of Hermannsburg, Kintore and Papunya, and part of southern Alice Springs. There were 5,728 electors enrolled in Namatjira as of August 2020.

The seat's first member, Alison Anderson, the former Labor-turned-independent-turned-Country Liberal (CLP) member for MacDonnell, won the seat handily at the 2012 Territory election amid a large swing to the CLP in the remote portions of the Territory.  Anderson left the CLP in 2014, and briefly served as Territory leader of the Palmer United Party before serving out the rest of her term as an independent.

Anderson did not contest the 2016 election.  Despite her previously fraught relations with Labor, she endorsed the Labor candidate in the seat, Alice Springs councillor Chansey Paech.  Although a redistribution seemingly consolidated the CLP majority in the seat by pushing it into Alice Springs, most commentators believed Anderson's endorsement, combined with the CLP's lackluster polling numbers, made Namatjira a likely Labor gain.  Paech took the seat on a swing of over 29 percent—large albeit not the largest at the election—amid Labor's landslide victory that year. However, a redistribution erased Paech's majority and made Namatjira notionally a marginal CLP seat. Paech switched to the neighbouring seat of Gwoja (formerly Stuart) at the 2020 election, and the CLP candidate Bill Yan regained the seat for his party.

Members for Namatjira

Election results

References

External links 
Division profile from the Northern Territory Electoral Commission

Namatjira